European Recovery Plan may refer to: 

 European Recovery Program (informally the Marshall Plan) in 1947
 European Economic Recovery Plan in 2008

See also 
 Recovery plan (disambiguation)